is a term used in traditional karate, meaning "to annihilate at one blow". This, however, does not mean that any clash can and should be resolved with the use of only one stroke, but it conveys the spirit that the karateka (player) must partake in.

Traditionally, according to various practical applications of kata, karate was modeled so that a person could face more than one opponent simultaneously. However, with the advent of sports karate, this characteristic has been ignored, thus de-emphasising Ikken Hissatsu. Arduous training is required to effectively attain such a technique.

During a struggle, levels of epinephrine in the bloodstream are higher than normal, which can generate a false perception of reality, causing injuries to be felt well after its end.

Still new evidence using clinical data and articles have shown that some of the stories where Ikken Hissatsu was applied may have some truth.  These sites are seen in injuries such as clipping the knees in football, in little league baseball when children are hit in the chest without protection causing commotio cordis.

References 

Japanese martial arts terminology
Karate